Tommy Ellis (born August 8, 1947) is an American former stock car racing driver who competed in the 1970s and 1980s. Often referred to as "Terrible" Tommy Ellis for his rough tactics, he won the last national late model sportsman championship in 1981, the final year before the format changed from "points chasing" late model sportsman racing at various short tracks across the country (now known as the Whelen All-American Series) to the current touring format, currently known as the Xfinity Series, the next year. He won the successor series in 1988.

Racing career
Ellis's success (12 poles and 8 wins) in the first two seasons of the Busch Series earned him a shot at a Winston Cup ride.  Driving for most of three seasons in the Chevrolet camp, his best finish was an eighth at Dover in 1986. He was also considered an excellent sub-driver in the Cup Series, filling in for Neil Bonnett in 1989 and replacing a suspended Geoff Bodine at Junior Johnson Motorsports two years later.

After his release from Freedlander Racing in 1986, Ellis returned to the Busch Series with J&J Racing. Between 1988 and 1990 Ellis won  nine poles and seven races.  He was the Busch Series champion in 1988 in an unsponsored Buick. In 1991, he competed in the Winston at Charlotte Motor Speedway, replacing Bodine.

His Busch Series career totals are 28 poles (second all-time behind Mark Martin) and 22 wins (tied for thirteenth all-time with Sam Ard).

Ellis's last Busch Series start was in 1995.

Ellis was a stunt driver for the film Days of Thunder along with Bobby Hamilton and drove race cars numbered 51 and 18 in selected races.

Legal troubles
In 2010, Ellis and his wife Brenda were sentenced to 18 months in prison after pleading guilty to federal tax-evasion charges. They had underreported the income generated by their car-wash business by over $300,000 between 2003 and 2007.

Motorsports career results

NASCAR
(key) (Bold – Pole position awarded by qualifying time. Italics – Pole position earned by points standings or practice time. * – Most laps led.)

Winston Cup Series

Daytona 500

Busch Series

ARCA Permatex SuperCar Series
(key) (Bold – Pole position awarded by qualifying time. Italics – Pole position earned by points standings or practice time. * – Most laps led.)

References

External links
 

1947 births
Living people
NASCAR drivers
NASCAR Xfinity Series champions
Racing drivers from Virginia
Sportspeople from Richmond, Virginia
ARCA Menards Series drivers
Hendrick Motorsports drivers